Camporredondo is a Spanish municipality of 166 inhabitants located in the autonomous community of Castile and León.

References

Castile and León